Jean-Paul Aimé Gobel (born 14 May 1943) is a French prelate of the Catholic Church who has worked in the diplomatic service of the Holy See.

Biography
Gobel was born on 14 May 1943 and ordained a priest for the Diocese of Annecy on 29 June 1969.

He completed the program of study at the Pontifical Ecclesiastical Academy in 1970 and then entered the diplomatic service of the Holy See. His early assignments were in Australia, Papua New Guinea, Mozambique, Nicaragua, and Burundi. Beginning in May 1989, Gobel was the first of several Holy See diplomats assigned to Hong Kong in order to study at close hand the Church in China and the longterm prospects for relations between China and the Holy See. While based in Hong Kong, he visited Mongolia at the invitation of the government to study how to establish a Catholic missionary presence there, which resulted in the assignment of that work to the Congregation of the Immaculate Heart of Mary.

Pope John Paul II named him titular archbishop of Calatia and Apostolic Nuncio to Armenia and to Georgia on 7 December 1993.  He received his episcopal consecration on 6 January 1994. On 15 January 1994, John Paul named him Nuncio to Azerbaijan as well. On 6 December 1997, John Paul named him Apostolic Nuncio to Senegal, Guinea-Bissau, Mali, and Cape Verde, and Apostolic Delegate to Mauritania.

On 31 October 2001, John Paul appointed him Apostolic Nuncio to Nicaragua, on 10 October 2007 to Iran, and on 5 January 2013 to Egypt as well as Delegate to the Arab League. He ended his service as nuncio when he was replaced by Bruno Musarò on 5 February 2015.

Notes

See also
 List of heads of the diplomatic missions of the Holy See

References

Sources

External links
 Catholic Hierarchy: Archbishop Jean-Paul Aimé Gobel 

1943 births
Living people
Pontifical Ecclesiastical Academy alumni
Roman Catholic titular archbishops
Apostolic Nuncios to Armenia
Apostolic Nuncios to Cape Verde
Apostolic Nuncios to Egypt
Apostolic Nuncios to the Arab League
Apostolic Nuncios to Guinea-Bissau
Apostolic Nuncios to Iran
Apostolic Nuncios to Mali
Apostolic Nuncios to Nicaragua
Apostolic Nuncios to Senegal
Apostolic Nuncios to Georgia (country)
Apostolic Nuncios to Azerbaijan